James Price (born 27 October 1981) is an English footballer who played at the right or centre of defence for Scarborough Athletic, in the Northern Premier League Division One North. Price has made over 150 appearances in the Football League and Football Conference.
As of 2021, he plays for and captains Emley in the Northern Counties East league Premier Division

Career
Price began his career as an apprentice at Leeds United in 1997. He did not make any appearances for Leeds and moved on to Doncaster Rovers in July 1999. He played a major part in the success of the Doncaster Rovers youth team in the 1999–00 and 2000–01 seasons, and signed a full-time professional contract in the summer of 2001. He broke into the first team in the 2001–02 season, making 17 league and cup appearances, but an injury suffered in November 2002 meant he missed the remainder of the 2002–03 season and in August 2003, he joined Halifax Town on a one-month loan to get match practice. He did not feature in the first team at the beginning of the 2004–05 season and joined Burton Albion in September 2004 on loan so to play first team football, but ended his loan spell after one month. Price made 55 appearances in all competitions in six seasons at Doncaster, before being released at the end of the 2004–05 season and joining York City after impressing during pre-season. Price made 24 league and cup appearances for York City during the 2005–06 season and then joined Harrogate Town in June 2006. After two seasons at Harrogate Town, he signed for Farsley Celtic in June 2008, and then joined UniBond side Bradford Park Avenue in February 2009, making his debut in a 6–4 win against Ashton United.

Notes

External links

1981 births
Living people
English footballers
Association football defenders
Leeds United F.C. players
Doncaster Rovers F.C. players
Halifax Town A.F.C. players
Burton Albion F.C. players
York City F.C. players
Harrogate Town A.F.C. players
Farsley Celtic A.F.C. players
Bradford (Park Avenue) A.F.C. players
English Football League players
National League (English football) players
Scarborough Athletic F.C. players
Sportspeople from Normanton, West Yorkshire
Ossett Town F.C. players
Garforth Town A.F.C. players